Refugee is a novel by Piers Anthony published in 1983.

Plot summary
Refugee is a novel in which Hope Hubris is raided by space pirates during an interplanetary journey.

Reception
Dave Langford reviewed Refugee for White Dwarf #65, and stated that "There are exciting bits, but Anthony desperately needs editing: his verbosity stretches scenes which should be quick and brutal into reams of increasingly gratuitous violence, which ultimately put me to sleep."

Reviews
Review by Joseph Nicholas (1984) in Paperback Inferno, Volume 7, Number 5

References

1983 novels
1983 science fiction novels
Avon (publisher) books
Bio of a Space Tyrant